Hermione Youlanda Ruby Clinton-Baddeley (13 November 1906 – 19 August 1986) was an English actress of theatre, film and television. She typically played brash, vulgar characters, often referred to as "brassy" or "blowsy". She found her milieu in revue, in which she played from the 1930s to the 1950s, co-starring several times with the English actress Hermione Gingold.

Baddeley was nominated for an Academy Award for Best Supporting Actress for her performance in Room at the Top (1959) and a Tony Award for Best Performance by a Leading Actress in a Play for The Milk Train Doesn't Stop Here Anymore in 1963. She portrayed Mrs Cratchit in the 1951 film Scrooge and Ellen the maid in the 1964 Disney film Mary Poppins. She voiced Madame Adelaide Bonfamille in the 1970 Disney animated film, The Aristocats. In 1975, she won a Golden Globe Award for Best Supporting Actress in a Television Series for her portrayal of Nell Naugatuck on the TV series Maude.

Early life
Baddeley was born in Broseley, Shropshire, to W.H. Clinton-Baddeley and Louise Bourdin who was French. Baddeley was a descendant of British American War of Independence General Sir Henry Clinton. Her elder sister, Angela Baddeley, was also an actress. Her half-brother, William Baddeley, was a Church of England clergyman who became Dean of Brisbane and Rural Dean of Westminster.

An early stage appearance came in 1923 when she appeared in Charles McEvoy's play The Likes of Her in London's West End.

Career

Baddeley was known for supporting performances in such films as Passport to Pimlico (1949), Tom Brown's Schooldays and Scrooge (both 1951),  The Pickwick Papers (1952), The Belles of St Trinian's (1954), Mary Poppins (as Ellen, the maidservant), and The Unsinkable Molly Brown (both 1964), although she first began making films back in the 1920s. One of her more important roles was in Brighton Rock (1947), in which she played Ida, one of the main characters, whose personal investigation into the disappearance of a friend threatens the anti-hero Pinkie.

Baddeley also had numerous stage credits. She had a long professional relationship with Noël Coward, appearing in many of his plays throughout the 1940s and 1950s. The most successful was her teaming with Hermione Gingold in Coward's comedy Fallen Angels, though the two women were reportedly "no longer on speaking terms" by the end of the run. 

Baddeley was nominated for an Academy Award for Best Supporting Actress for her portrayal of Simone Signoret's best friend in Jack Clayton's Room at the Top (1959). With 2 minutes and 19 seconds of screen time, her role is the shortest ever to be nominated for an Academy Award. In 1960 she played prostitute Doll Tearsheet in the BBC's series of Shakespeare history plays An Age of Kings, acting alongside her sister Angela as Mistress Quickly. In 1963, she was nominated for Broadway's Tony Award as Best Actress (Dramatic) for The Milk Train Doesn't Stop Here Anymore.

She was known to American audiences for roles in Bewitched, The Cara Williams Show, Camp Runamuck, Batman, Wonder Woman, $weepstake$, Little House on the Prairie, and Maude (playing the title character's second housekeeper, Nell Naugatuck). Toward the end of her career, Baddeley was also a voice-over actress, including roles in The Aristocats (1970) and The Secret of NIMH (1982).

Personal life

In 1928 Baddeley married English aristocrat and socialite David Tennant (third son of Edward Tennant, 1st Baron Glenconner). She arrived an hour late for the wedding, having misremembered the time booked for the ceremony. They rented Teffont Evias Manor, which became known for their boisterous parties (including mixed naked bathing in the goldfish pond). She had a daughter, Pauline Laetitia Tennant (born 6 February 1927 – died 6 December 2008); the couple divorced in 1937.

In 1940 Baddeley married Major John Henry ("Dozey") Willis, of the 12th Lancers, son of Major-General Edward Willis, Lieutenant Governor of Jersey. They divorced in 1946. She had a relatively brief relationship with actor Laurence Harvey, 22 years her junior. Although Harvey proposed marriage to her, Baddeley thought the age difference was too great and declined.

Baddeley was known for her devotion to animals. She dedicated her autobiography, The Unsinkable Hermione Baddeley, to her pet dog. She continued to work in film and television until shortly before the end of her life.

She died following a series of strokes on 19 August 1986, aged 79, at Cedars-Sinai Medical Center in Los Angeles. Her remains were returned to the United Kingdom. She was survived by two children, Pauline Tennant and David, from her first marriage.

Filmography

 A Daughter in Revolt (1927) as Calamity Kate
 The Guns of Loos (1928) as Mavis
 Caste (1930) as Polly Eccles
 Royal Cavalcade (1935) as Barmaid
 Kipps (1941) as Miss Mergle
 It Always Rains on Sunday (1947) as Mrs. Spry
 Brighton Rock (1948) as Ida Arnold
 No Room at the Inn (1948) as Mrs. Waters
 Quartet (1948) as Beatrice Sunbury (segment "The Kite")
 Passport to Pimlico (1949) as Edie Randall
 Dear Mr. Prohack (1949) as Eve Prohack
 The Woman in Question (1950) as Mrs. Finch
 Hell Is Sold Out (1951) as Mme. Louise Menstrier
 There Is Another Sun (1951) as Sarah
 Scrooge (1951) as Mrs. Cratchit
 Tom Brown's Schooldays (1951) as Sally Harrowell
 Song of Paris (1952) as Mrs. Ibbetson
 Time Gentlemen, Please! (1952) as Emma Stebbins
 The Pickwick Papers (1952) as Mrs. Bardell
 Cosh Boy (1953) as Mrs. Collins
 Counterspy (1953) as Madame Del Mar
 The Belles of St. Trinian's (1954) as Miss Drownder
 Women Without Men (1956) as Grace
 Room at the Top (1959) as Elspeth
 Jet Storm (1959) as Mrs. Satterly
 Expresso Bongo (1959) as Penelope
 Let's Get Married (1960) as Mrs. O'Grady
 Midnight Lace (1960) as Dora Hammer
 Rag Doll (1961) as Princess
 Information Received (1961) as Maudie
 The Unsinkable Molly Brown (1964) as Buttercup Grogan
 Mary Poppins  (1964) as Ellen, The Domestic
 Harlow (1965) as Marie Dressler
 Marriage on the Rocks  (1965) as Jeannie MacPherson
 Do Not Disturb (1965) as Vanessa Courtwright
 The Adventures of Bullwhip Griffin (1967) as Miss Irene Chesney
 The Happiest Millionaire (1967) as Mrs. Worth
 The Aristocats (1970) as Madame Adelaide Bonfamille (voice)
 Up the Front (1972) as Monique
 The Black Windmill (1974) as Hetty
 South Riding (TV adaptation) (1974) as Mrs. Beddows
 C.H.O.M.P.S. (1979) as Mrs. Flower
 There Goes the Bride (1980) as Daphne Drimond
 The Secret of NIMH (1982) as Auntie Shrew

See also
 List of Academy Award records

References

External links

 

 Performances in the Theatre Archive University of Bristol
 Hermione Baddeley profile at BFI Screenonline

1906 births
1986 deaths
English film actresses
English television actresses
English voice actresses
English stage actresses
English people of French descent
People from Broseley
Best Supporting Actress Golden Globe (television) winners
English expatriates in the United States
20th-century English actresses